Salm-Reifferscheid-Hainsbach was a German statelet, which was a partition of Salm-Reifferscheid-Bedbur. It was mediatised in 1806.

Counts of Salm-Reifferscheid-Hainsbach (1734–1811)
 Leopold Anthony (1734–1760)
 Francis Wenceslaus (1760–1811)

1811 disestablishments in Germany
States and territories established in 1734